was a Japanese planning specialist recognized as the developer of Hoshin Kanri (a strategic planning methodology). With the late Shigeru Mizuno, he developed Quality Function Deployment (a group decision making technique). Akao and Mizuno also co-founded the Quality Function Deployment Institute: a non-profit organization dedicated to dissemination and advancement of QFD.

Akao received a Ph.D. in 1964 from the Tokyo Institute of Technology.

Books
Akao authored or co-authored several books:

 Quality Function Deployment: Integrating Customer Requirements Into Product Design (1991)
 Hoshin Kanri: Policy Deployment for Successful TQM (Corporate Leadership) (1990)
 QFD: The Customer Driven Approach to Quality Planning and Deployment (co-authored with Shigeru Mizuno) (1994)

Awards
 Deming Prize: 1978
 Quality Control Literature Prize: 1960 and 1978

References

External links
QFD Institute: Who is Dr. Akao?

1928 births
Japanese business theorists
2016 deaths
Quality
Quality experts
Tokyo Institute of Technology alumni